Milan Tichý (born September 22, 1969) is a Czech former professional ice hockey defenceman.

He was drafted 153rd overall by the Chicago Blackhawks in the 1989 NHL Entry Draft and played 13 games for them during the 1992–93 NHL season. He was claimed by the Florida Panthers in the 1993 NHL Expansion Draft but never played a game for them and was traded to the Winnipeg Jets for Brent Severyn before the season started. He spent the entire season in the American Hockey League with the Moncton Hawks and never played for Winnipeg. He moved to New York Islanders in 1994 and played ten games over two seasons.

He is currently an amateur scout for the National Hockey League's Columbus Blue Jackets, scouting players in the Czech Republic, Slovakia, Finland, Russia, Sweden and Germany.

Career statistics

Regular season and playoffs

International

References

External links

1969 births
Living people
Chicago Blackhawks draft picks
Chicago Blackhawks players
Columbus Blue Jackets scouts
Czechoslovak ice hockey defencemen
Czech ice hockey defencemen
Denver Grizzlies players
Indianapolis Ice players
Moncton Hawks players
Nashville Predators scouts
New York Islanders players
Sportspeople from Plzeň
Utah Grizzlies (IHL) players
Czechoslovak expatriate sportspeople in the United States
Czechoslovak expatriate ice hockey people
Czech expatriate ice hockey players in Canada
Czech expatriate ice hockey players in the United States